Gold mining has been a part of Nova Scotia's heritage for 150 plus years and continues to this day. Over a million ounces of gold have been produced in the province since mining began in 1861. Although not as well known as the gold rushes of California, the Klondike, Australia, and South Africa, three distinct rushes resulted in an economic boom in the province and saw the birth and sometimes demise of many new communities.

Geology
Most gold mining in the province has taken place south of the Minas Fault Zone in Meguma terrane, with three more mines in Cape Breton.

Discovery and production

Gold may have been sighted as early as 1578 when explorer Sir Humphrey Gilbert was given a patent to explore for gold and silver in the New World and explored along the coast.  Additionally, village names such as Bras d'Or, Cape d'Or, and Jeddore (Jet d'Or) indicate that French settlers may have found gold, but no ancient workings or proof has been found.

Gold was officially discovered in Nova Scotia in late May 1860, by John G. Pulsifer at Mooseland, Halifax County.  Prior to this, unofficial discoveries were made in the Musquodoboit and Fort Clarence areas in 1857.  The first authenticated discovery was made by Captain Champagne L'Estrange of the Royal Artillery in 1858 in Mooseland, the same area where Pulsifer made his discovery two years later.

First Gold Rush (1861–1874)

The first gold rush in Nova Scotia began in 1861 and lasted until 1874.  Gold hysteria attracted thousands to the gold fields. This was the most dramatic of the rushes, initially characterized by the frenzy of inexperienced miners with dreams of striking it rich.

In the beginning, the miners panned for gold or smashed quartz rocks with hand tools at small individual claims.  Within a year, companies began arriving in the area with heavy machinery to construct shafts, dig ore, crush rock, and process the gold. They had the capital to finance underground mines and bought up smaller claims, consolidating them into larger holdings.

In an effort to control the gold hysteria in April 1861, the government of Nova Scotia intervened and declared the Mooseland and nearby Tangier gold districts.  After the declaration, other discoveries along the Eastern Shore were quick to follow in the next half year.  The communities of Tangier, Lawrencetown, The Ovens, Wine Harbour, Sherbrooke (Goldenville), Waverley, Country Harbour, Isaacs Harbour and Gold River sprung up ‘overnight’ and the miners and their families moved in.

Second Gold Rush (1896–1903)

The second gold rush period was dominated by large companies, who continued buying up smaller claims, and hiring locals to mine and operate the stamp mills and machinery. Individual consignment miners, known as tributors, worked claims as well.  The province became known as the place of "rich man’s diggings" due to the large costs involved in deep mines working lower grade ore. Capital investment, often American and British, and the improved technology needed to build and operate the mines ballooned into a multimillion-dollar industry. This period is considered the golden age of gold mining in Nova Scotia. Production exceeded 20,000 ounces per year for sixteen years and in three of those years exceeded 30,000 ounces annually (1898, 1900, 1901). Along with racking up the highest yields per year, this period is noted more for organized planning than feverish hysteria.

Third Gold Rush (1932–1942)
The demand for arsenopyrite, a mineral associated with gold in Nova Scotia, along with cheap energy costs and an increase in the price of gold (US$20.67 to US$34 per ounce), created an impetus for Nova
Scotia’s third gold rush. The rush spanned ten years (1932-1942) and 158,000 ounces (4,479,300 g) of gold were produced.

Recent activity
Atlantic Gold (previously DDV Gold Ltd.) opened an open pit gold mine at Moose River Gold Mines in 2017. Deposits at the project named Touquoy hold an estimated 635,000 ounces of gold, worth $700 million in 2012. The Moose River Gold Mines site will also process ore from the company's mine at its Beaver Dam deposit, 37 km away, which has an estimated yield of 426,600 ounces. The Moose River mine will have a life of five years and Beaver Dam just three. Production at the Touquoy deposit began in 2018. See also: Orex Exploration.

In 2018 the Government of Nova Scotia initiated the process of closing former gold mining sites in Montague Gold Mines and Goldenville that are heavily contaminated with arsenic and mercury.

Gold districts

There are 65 declared gold districts in Nova Scotia.  There were around 350 mines worked in these districts.

References

External links
Gold: A Nova Scotia treasure

Mining in Nova Scotia
Gold mining in Canada
Canadian gold rushes